St Helena School is a coeducational secondary school with academy status, located in Colchester, Essex, England. The school is situated on Sheepen Road opposite Colchester Institute and is of easy reach from both Colchester North and Colchester Town train stations.

History
St Helena Secondary School was opened on Friday 28 January 1938 by Kenneth Lindsay, Parliamentary Secretary to the Board of Education in Neville Chamberlain's National Government. In those days, education in Colchester was controlled by the Colchester Borough Education Committee, chaired by Alderman Alex Blaxill, the Mayor. Originally, the school comprised two 'schools'; boys with Mr H Hepburn Reid as Headmaster; and girls with Miss M Lucas as Headmistress. There were some shared facilities, but otherwise there was strictly enforced segregation.

The school took its name from Colchester's patron saint. According to the Historia Regum Britanniae of Geoffrey of Monmouth written in the twelfth century, St Helena was the daughter of Coel, a legendary King of Britain and duke of Colchester in the third century. She was the mother of Constantine the Great, the first Christian to rule the Roman Empire.

The original segregated arrangement remained until 1961, when, under Mr Hepburn Reid's stewardship, the school became a co-educational Secondary Modern. After twenty-five years as Head of the School, Mr Hepburn Reid retired in 1963 to be succeeded by Mr H S Boyle. When the school was reorganised again in 1977 becoming an 11-18 mixed Comprehensive School, Mr J D McIlwain became Headteacher. By this time the school had become part of the Essex Local Education Authority. It was the Essex LEA which implemented secondary reorganisation in Colchester in 1987, converting St Helena School to an 11-16 mixed comprehensive, and opening a Sixth Form College on North Hill in the town centre.

The school celebrated its golden jubilee in January 1988, and was honoured by the presence of the Rt. Hon. Kenneth Baker, the Secretary of State for Education and Science. On the Commemoration Day, (28 January 1988), he was accompanied by Kenneth Lindsay, making his first return to the school since he had opened it in 1938.

On 20 March 2020, the school was temporarily closed due to the outbreak of the coronavirus.

School buildings
Although the original buildings from 1938 school still stand, new facilities have been added as well as minor structural maintenance. Two major building programmes have brought added capacity, so that an original capacity of 720 has now increased to over 1000. In 1976 a new block was constructed comprising general classrooms, science laboratories and art rooms. In 1991 a Sports Hall and technology rooms were built. The school which emerged as a Grant-maintained school in September 1993 has a blend of traditional and modern. In 2007, a media block was built. In 2014 plans were put in place to build another block which will contain unisex toilets, science rooms and domestic science rooms. It is predicted to be finished by September 2015.

Houses
St Helena runs a House system. Each house consists of 10 tutor groups with up to 5 students from each Year group in it.

The original house system was disbanded over 20 years ago, but was reintroduced in January 2004. The houses, apart from one, kept their original names:

 Abbey- Red
 Castle- Blue
 Priory- Yellow 
 Temple- Green

The houses are named after the Roman areas of Colchester.

Specialist school and academy status
In 2005, St Helena became a Specialist Media Arts College under the Governments Specialist School programme. The school then built a  media centre which houses a drama studio, media computer suite and a television / radio studio. the school converted to academy status in March 2012.

Notable former pupils
Dominic King, racewalker who competed in the 2012 Summer Olympics
Jamie Moul, professional golfer
 Sir Bob Russell, long-serving Colchester MP and High Steward

References

External links
St Helena School Website
Sigma Trust Website

Secondary schools in Essex
Educational institutions established in 1938
1938 establishments in England
Academies in Essex
Schools in Colchester (town)